Line 13 of the Chengdu Metro is a metro line in Chengdu, Sichuan, China. The first phase of the line is currently under construction and is entirely underground.

History
Construction on the line began in 2020.

Opening timeline

Stations

References

Chengdu Metro lines
Transport infrastructure under construction in China